Mantidactylus delormei is a species of frogs in the family Mantellidae. The species is endemic to Madagascar.

References

delormei
Amphibians described in 1938
Endemic frogs of Madagascar